Michele Claudio Emmausso (born 4 August 1997) is an Italian footballer who plays as a winger for  club Picerno.

Career

Genoa 
Born in Naples, Emmausso was a youth giocatore Genoa.

Loan to Taranto 
On 13 January 2017, Emmausso was signed by Serie C club Taranto on a 6-month loan deal. One week later, he made his professional debut in Serie C for Taranto as a substitute replacing Mario Bollino in the 68th minute of a 0–0 home draw against Siracusa. On 19 March he scored his first professional goal in the 87th minute of a 3–1 away defeat against Modena. On 2 April, Emmausso played his first match as a starter for Taranto and he scored his second goal in the 11th minute of a 2–2 away draw against Virtus Francavilla, but he was sent off with a red card in the 69th minute. On 15 April he played his first entire match for Taranto, a 1–0 home defeat against Monopoli. Emmausso ended his loan to Taranto with 11 appearances, 2 goals and 1 assist.

Loan to Robur Siena 
On 18 July 2017, Emmausso was loaned to Serie C side Robur Siena on a season-long loan deal. On 4 October he made his Serie C debut for Robur Siena as a substitute replacing Alessandro Marotta in the 72nd minute of a 0–0 home draw against Giana Erminio. Nine days later he scored his first goal for Robur Siena, as a substitute, in the 92nd minute of a 1–0 home win over Pro Piacenza. On 8 November, Emmausso played his first match as a starter for Robur Siena, a 2–1 away win over Pistoiese, he was replaced by Samuele Neglia in the 81st minute. On 20 December he was sent off with a red card, as a substitute, in the 92nd minute of a 2–0 away defeat against Cuneo. On 5 May 2018 he scored his second in the 76th minute of a 3–2 away win over Prato. Emmauasso ended his season-long loan to Robur Siena with 17 appearances, 2 goals and 1 assist.

Loan to Reggina and Cuneo 
On 9 July 2018, Emmausso was signed by Serie C club Reggina on a season-long loan deal. On 18 September he made his debut for Reggiana, in Serie C, as a starter in a 3–0 away defeat against Trapani, he was replaced by Salvatore Sandomenico after 45 minutes. However, in January 2019, his loan was interrupted and he left Reggina with 12 appearances, three as a starter, but he never played an entire match.

On 31 January 2019, Emmausso was loaned to Cuneo on a 6-month loan deal. Eleven days later, on 10 February, he made his debut for Cuneo in a 2–1 away win over Olbia, he was replaced by Edoardo Defendi in the 62nd minute. On 5 March he scored his first goal for Cuneo in the 48th minute of a 2–0 home win over Virtus Entella. Emmausso ended his 6-month loan to Cuneo with 14 appearances and 1 goal.

Vibonese
On 2 September 2019, Emmausso joined Serie C club Vibonese on an undisclosed fee. Six days later, on 8 September, he made his debut for the club as a substitute replacing Nicolàs Bubas in the 79th minute of a 1–1 away draw against Cavese. On 22 September, Emmausso played his first match as a starter for the club, a 2–0 away defeat against Reggina, he was replaced by Filippo Berardi after half-time. Three days later, on 25 September, he scored his first goal for the club in the 61st minute of a 3–1 home win over Picerno.

Catania
On 3 October 2020 he signed a two-year contract with Catania.

Lecco
On 11 January 2021, he moved to Lecco.

Campobasso
On 4 August 2021 he joined to Campobasso.

Picerno
On 12 January 2023, Emmausso signed with Picerno.

Career statistics

References

External links
 

1997 births
Living people
Footballers from Naples
Italian footballers
Association football forwards
Serie C players
Genoa C.F.C. players
Taranto F.C. 1927 players
A.C.N. Siena 1904 players
Reggina 1914 players
A.C. Cuneo 1905 players
U.S. Vibonese Calcio players
Catania S.S.D. players
Calcio Lecco 1912 players
S.S.D. Città di Campobasso players
Potenza Calcio players
AZ Picerno players